Marqueze Washington (born September 29, 1993) is an American sprinter. He competed collegiately for the University of Arkansas. He won a silver medal in the 4 × 400 m relay at the 2018 IAAF World Indoor Championships, but only competed in the heats.

Personal bests
Outdoor
100 m: 10.07 (Mesa, Arizona 2017)
200 m: 20.32 (Mesa, Arizona 2017)
300 m: 32.76 (Philadelphia 2022)
400 m: 45.62 (Fayetteville, Arkansas 2022)
Indoor
60 m: 6.60 (Albuquerque 2017)
200 m: 20.56 (Fayetteville, Arkansas 2017)
300 m: 32.63 (Fayetteville, Arkansas 2016)
400 m: 45.24 (Fayetteville, Arkansas 2018)

References

External links
 

1993 births
Living people
People from West Monroe, Louisiana
American male sprinters
Arkansas Razorbacks men's track and field athletes
Track and field athletes from Louisiana
World Athletics Indoor Championships medalists